Márta Komáromi was a female Hungarian international table tennis player.

Table tennis career
She won a silver at the 1930 World Table Tennis Championships in the women's doubles with Magda Gál and the following year won a bronze medal at the 1931 World Table Tennis Championships in the mixed doubles with Laszlo Bellak.

See also
 List of table tennis players
 List of World Table Tennis Championships medalists

References

Hungarian female table tennis players
World Table Tennis Championships medalists